Highmark Stadium is a stadium in Orchard Park, New York, in the Southtowns of the Buffalo metropolitan area. The stadium opened in 1973 as Rich Stadium and is the home venue of the Buffalo Bills of the National Football League (NFL). It was known as Ralph Wilson Stadium from 1998 to 2015, New Era Field from 2016 to 2019, and Bills Stadium in 2020.

History

Finding a new place to call home
An original franchise of the American Football League in 1960, the Buffalo Bills played their first 13 seasons at War Memorial Stadium, a multiuse WPA project stadium that opened in 1938, located on Buffalo's East Side. While suitable for AFL play in the 1960s, the "Rockpile" (as the stadium came to be nicknamed), was in disrepair and with a capacity of under 47,000, undersized for a National Football League (NFL) team. The league mandate instituted after the AFL–NFL merger of 1970 dictated a minimum of 50,000 seats.

In early 1971, owner Ralph Wilson was exploring options to relocate the team, possibly to Seattle, with other cities such as Memphis and Tampa soon expressing interest as well. The potential loss of the team hastened the stadium project and Rich Stadium opened in 1973. The location and construction of the stadium in Erie County were the source of years of litigation, which ended with a financial settlement for a developer who had planned to erect a domed stadium in Lancaster. However, plans changed because it was not wanted to be close to Lancaster High School. The stadium was ultimately built by Frank Schoenle and his construction company. Bonds were approved by the county legislature in September 1971.

Naming rights

Rich Products, a Buffalo-based food products company, signed a 25-year, $1.5 million deal ($60,000 per year), by which the venue would be called "Rich Stadium"; one of the earliest examples of the sale of naming rights in North American sports. (The name was somewhat of a compromise, after Bills owner and founder Ralph Wilson rejected the name Rich wanted to use, "Coffee Rich Park.") By a vote of 16–4, the county legislature approved the name in November 1972, despite a matching offer from Wilson to name it "Buffalo Bills Stadium."

When the Bills organization regularly referred to the stadium without the "Rich" name, Rich Products brought a $7.5 million lawsuit against the team in 1976. After the original deal expired after a quarter century in 1998, the stadium was renamed in honor of Wilson. Rich Products balked at paying a greatly increased rights fee, which would have brought the price up to par with other NFL stadiums.

On August 13, 2016, Buffalo-based New Era Cap Company and the Bills reached a seven-year, $35 million agreement for stadium naming rights. The Bills and New Era officially announced the stadium's new name of New Era Field five days later, on August 18, 2016.

On July 15, 2020, the Bills announced that New Era Cap asked to be released from their naming rights and sponsorship deal, and the two sides agreed on terms to terminate the contract. The statement referred to the venue only as "the stadium", and the Bills' website scrubbed all references to New Era. Under the terms of the 2012 lease agreement, in addition to Erie County having to approve any new stadium name as the stadium's legal owners, the government of the state of New York would also have a veto; the clause was inserted to quash ambush marketing attempts. Under this clause, Erie County executive Mark Poloncarz rejected a naming rights bid by minitoilet maker Tushy Bidets, saying that any name that "embarrasses the community" would not even be considered regardless of the size of the bid. Signs bearing the "New Era Field" name were removed beginning July 24. On August 20, the team announced they would temporarily use the name Bills Stadium until they found a new naming-rights partner.

On March 29, 2021, the team announced that the stadium’s new name would be Highmark Stadium after reaching a 10-year agreement with Highmark Blue Cross Blue Shield of Western New York.

Stadium records and facts
The first NFL playoff game at the stadium came in the 1988 season, a 17–10 Bills victory over the Houston Oilers on January 1, 1989. The Bills won every ensuing playoff game at the stadium until they were defeated on December 28, 1996 by the Jacksonville Jaguars. They would not lose another playoff game at the stadium until January 22, 2023, when they lost 27–10 in the AFC Divisional Round against the Cincinnati Bengals.

From Highmark Stadium's opening until the end of the 2019 NFL season, the Bills have defeated each of the 31 other teams there at least once and are unbeaten there against three teams: the Arizona Cardinals (4–0), Green Bay Packers (7–0), and Tampa Bay Buccaneers (2–0).

Design and renovation

The stadium is open-air, with a capacity of 71,870. It has never had a natural grass surface; AstroTurf was installed in the stadium upon its opening in 1973. The first renovation occurred in 1984 when the stadium's capacity was increased to 80,290 with the addition of 16 executive suites.

Eight years later in 1992, 24 more executive suites were added. In 1994, major renovations were made to the stadium including the addition of the Red Zone and Goal Line clubs that are enclosed in glass and have 500 seats. These renovations also added 14 executive suites. A massive $9.1 million (inflation adjusted)  Sony JumboTron video scoreboard was a major update in 1994 and was the largest in the U.S. at the time. In 1998, $57 million were spent to refit the stadium with larger seats and more luxury and club seating as a part of the Bills lease renewal with Erie County. This caused the seating capacity to be reduced to just under 74,000.

In the 2003 offseason, the original style turf was replaced with a newer AstroTurf product, AstroTurf GameDay Grass (also known as AstroPlay). Over  of Mitsubishi Diamond Vision LED Ribbon Boards were also installed in the interior during that renovation. The total cost for the 2007 project was $5.2 million, In 2011, the Bills changed their turf to a new product, A-Turf Titan, produced by a Western New York company. As of the 2011 season, Buffalo is the only NFL stadium using the A-Turf Titan product.

On December 21, 2012, the lease negotiations between the Bills, Erie County, and the state of New York ended with the Bills signing a ten-year lease to stay in Buffalo until 2023. The agreement included $130 million in improvements to New Era Field. Renovations included new larger entrance gates, larger HD sponsor boards added to each side of the video scoreboard, two new  HD video boards, larger LED sponsor board added on the tunnel end of the stadium, expanded concessions, new team store, and redesign of areas and lots just outside the entrance gates. In addition, a life-sized statue of team founder Ralph Wilson was posthumously added to a new area outside the team store called "Founder's Plaza" in 2015.

Buffalo, by virtue of its position downwind of Lake Erie, is one of the nation's windiest cities, and as a result, Highmark Stadium is difficult for kickers, with swirling winds that change direction rapidly. This is exacerbated by the stadium's design. The open end lies parallel to the direction of the prevailing winds, so when the winds come in, they immediately drop down into the bowl, causing the stadium's signature wind patterns.

Seating capacity

Other uses

Other sporting events

The size of the field at Highmark Stadium is specifically designed for National Football League dimensions and sight lines, along with football and team markings being formed permanently into the turf, making it extremely difficult for other outdoor sporting events such as soccer, baseball, track and field, or rugby to be held there. None of any significance have ever been held at the stadium.

The stadium annually hosts the region's Section VI and Monsignor Martin Athletic Association high school football playoffs.

On July 14, 1984, the stadium hosted a one-time-only supercross motorcycle racing event.

The opening ceremony of the 1993 Summer Universiade was held at the stadium.

College football
Syracuse University played two home games at the stadium in 1979. Syracuse was left without an on-campus home for one season between the demolition of Archbold Stadium and the construction of the Carrier Dome on its footprint.

The stadium hosted a Black Friday contest between the UB Bulls and the Bowling Green Falcons in 2013.

Adjacent to the stadium is 1,800-seat West Herr Stadium, the home field for Erie Community College's football team.

Ice hockey
On January 1, 2008, the Buffalo Sabres hosted the Pittsburgh Penguins in the first NHL Winter Classic. The Penguins won 2–1 in a shootout in front of 71,217. On December 29, 2017, the stadium hosted a match between the U.S. and Canada at the 2018 World Junior Ice Hockey Championships being hosted by Buffalo.

Concerts
Nearly 30 concerts have been held at the stadium, starting in 1974 with Eric Clapton and The Band.

Several bands have played the stadium multiple times, including The Rolling Stones, who played there in 1975, 1978, 1981, 1997, and 2015. The Grateful Dead played the stadium a few times in the 1980s and early 1990s with their July 4, 1989 Truckin' Up to Buffalo performance being documented on CD/DVD. The Who, Dave Matthews Band, and The Jackson Five have all played at the stadium multiple times as well.

Double and multi-billed concerts have also been scheduled at the stadium.

There were notable large concerts that were scheduled to take place at the stadium but were later canceled. Led Zeppelin was set to perform at the stadium on their 1977 North American Tour. The concert was one of the seven remaining concerts on the tour that were canceled due to the death of lead singer Robert Plant's son. A Bruce Springsteen concert, that was originally scheduled at the stadium in 2003, was moved to the smaller Darien Lake Performing Arts Center due to low ticket sales.

Concert appearances began to wane in the 1990s at the stadium, which ended with Dave Matthews Band and NSYNC each playing a concert in June 2001, with no more concerts at the stadium for 14 years. This was due to the combination of a declining number of stadium rock acts, population decline, and the availability of other, more intimate, venues in Western New York such as Artpark in Lewiston, Darien Lake Performing Arts Center in Corfu, the Thursday at the Square series among others, Seneca Niagara Casino, and the KeyBank Center, which opened in 1996, replacing Buffalo Memorial Auditorium in downtown Buffalo.

Non-sporting or music events
The stadium has also hosted the Drum Corps International championships three times.

Autocross racing events are held in the one of the stadium's parking lots during the spring, summer, and fall months. The local WNY SCCA Chapter hosts the autocrosses.

Future

Although new stadium ideas had been proposed before the death of Ralph Wilson, with the new ownership of Terry and Kim Pegula, the prospect of a new stadium has been raised again. During his press conference to acquire the team, Terry Pegula stated, "we will gradually proceed to plan and design a stadium for the Buffalo Bills."

On June 18, 2021, the Pegulas chose Legends Global Planning to represent ownership, consult on a new stadium and sell sponsorships and premium seats for the venue. In addition, an unnamed source claimed that the Bills are planning to build a new stadium in Orchard Park to replace Highmark Stadium, with two of the television stations in Rochester, New York reporting the unnamed source's claims as fact. Under the claimed plan, the project is expected to take three to five years to complete, with a possibility to be ready by 2025. The Bills may be forced to use an alternate site while the team waits for the project to be completed, with relocating to Beaver Stadium in State College, Pennsylvania and/or reviving the Bills Toronto Series being options during the construction. Neither the Bills nor any official entity in Erie County has verified or denied the claims.

On March 28, 2022, New York Governor Kathy Hochul announced that a deal had been reached between New York State, Erie County, and the Bills for a 62,000-seat, $1.4 billion dollar stadium in Orchard Park. It will be built across the street from Highmark Stadium adjacent to Erie Community College’s south campus, and is expected to open in 2026.

Alleged curse

Since the Bills moved from War Memorial Stadium into their current home, it has been noted that the team has not won a championship since, and has had frequent periods of heartbreak, including four Super Bowl losses in a row. Several writers have owed this to the fact that the stadium is built just yards away from a family cemetery as part of territory once owned by the Sheldon Family. A plaque just outside the stadium at gates 6-7 graces the cemetery and also notes that the stadium was built on the site of an ancient Wenro village.

Photo gallery

See also
War Memorial Stadium (Buffalo)

References

Further reading
 R. Minetor, Cursed in New York: Stories of the Damned in the Empire State, Globe Pequot Press, 2015. Includes a section about the stadium's potential "curse"

External links

 
 Ralph Wilson Stadium at StadiumDB.com

1973 establishments in New York (state)
American football venues in New York (state)
Buffalo Bills stadiums
Ice hockey venues in New York (state)
National Football League venues
Outdoor ice hockey venues in the United States
Pegula Sports and Entertainment
Sports venues completed in 1973
Sports venues in Buffalo, New York
Sports venues in Erie County, New York
U.S. Route 20